Nathan Saunders (born 22 July 1976) is a former Australian rules footballer who played with Western Bulldogs in the Australian Football League (AFL) in 2002.

References

External links

Living people
1976 births
Australian rules footballers from Victoria (Australia)
Western Bulldogs players
Werribee Football Club players